SCSL is an acronym that can stand for:

 Scientific Computing Software Library, by Silicon Graphics
 Special Court for Sierra Leone
 Sun Community Source Licensing, for Sun Java
 Staffordshire County Senior League in English football